Gelateria Italiana, S.A. is an ice cream chain that produces and sells the Yea! Gelato brand Italian style ice cream from Managua, Nicaragua.

History

The first Yea! Gelato shop opened on November 24, 2010 in the Galerías Santo Domingo shopping mall in Managua, Nicaragua. Gelateria Italiana sells the Yea! Gelato brand ice cream, a soft ice cream containing little or no air, made with milk, cream, various sugars, and flavoring such as fresh fruit and nut purees.

In addition to the ice cream shops, the more than 100 flavors of the Yea! Gelato brand can also be found at the Supermercados La Colonia and La Unión (Walmart) supermarket chains.

Yea! Gelato shops

Galerías Santo Domingo
Metrocentro Managua
Multicentro Las Américas
Universidad Centroamericana

References 

Ice cream brands
Food and drink companies of Nicaragua
Companies based in Managua
Restaurants established in 2010
Nicaraguan brands